German submarine U-543 was a Type IXC U-boat of Nazi Germany's Kriegsmarine during World War II.

She was laid down at the Deutsche Werft (yard) in Hamburg as yard number 364 on 3 July 1942, launched on 3 February and commissioned on 21 April with Kapitänleutnant Hans-Jürgen Hellriegel in command.

U-543 began her service career with training as part of the 4th U-boat Flotilla from 21 April 1943. She was reassigned to the 10th flotilla for operations on 1 November.

She carried out two patrols, but did not sink any ships. She was a member of three wolfpacks.

She was sunk on 2 July 1944 southwest of Tenerife by an American aircraft.

Design
German Type IXC/40 submarines were slightly larger than the original Type IXCs. U-543 had a displacement of  when at the surface and  while submerged. She had two shafts and two  propellers.

U-543 was fitted with six  torpedo tubes (four fitted at the bow and two at the stern), 22 torpedoes, one  SK C/32 naval gun, 180 rounds, and a  SK C/30 as well as a  C/30 anti-aircraft gun. The boat had a complement of forty-eight.

Service history

First patrol
The boat departed Kiel on 9 November 1943, moved through the North Sea, negotiated the gap between Iceland and the Faroe Islands and into the Atlantic Ocean. She entered Lorient, on the French Atlantic coast, on 24 January 1944.

Second patrol and loss
Her second foray took her west of Portugal where she found a small convoy on 9 April 1944, but she was driven off by depth charges from the escorts.

The submarine escaped undamaged and sailed to the west coast of Africa, then across the central Atlantic to the waters off Brazil.

The same mix of rockets and a FIDO were used, but were successful.

Fifty-eight men died; there were no survivors.

Wolfpacks
U-543 took part in three wolfpacks, namely:
 Coronel (4 – 8 December 1943)
 Coronel 2 (8 – 14 December 1943)
 Coronel 3 (14 – 17 December 1943)

References

Bibliography

External links

German Type IX submarines
U-boats commissioned in 1943
U-boats sunk in 1944
World War II submarines of Germany
1943 ships
World War II shipwrecks in the Atlantic Ocean
Ships built in Hamburg
U-boats sunk by depth charges
U-boats sunk by US aircraft
Ships lost with all hands
Maritime incidents in July 1944